Roots is a 1968 studio album by American singing duo the Everly Brothers. Originally on the Warner Bros. label, the album was re-released on CD in 1995 by Warner Bros. and in 2005 by Collectors' Choice Music. The album is a classic example of early country rock.

Critical reception

On its release, Roots was not a commercial success for the Everly Brothers, failing to widen their fanbase  in spite of their excursion into the new field of country rock. At the time of its release, Rolling Stone, which awarded the album 4 stars in its coverage of the band in The New Rolling Stone Album Guide, described the album as "a showcase for the superb talent of the Everlys as they are today", asserting that anyone "interested in the so-called country revival now sweeping rock should pick up this album". In his reviews of the bands subsequent albums, critic Robert Christgau often utilized Roots as a touchstone, referring to it as "sweet", "thoughtful, even-tempered, and unique". Today, the album is touted as "one of the finest early country-rock albums".

Track listing
Side 1
"The Introduction: The Everly Family (1952)" – 1:11
"Mama Tried" (Merle Haggard) – 2:18
"Less of Me" (Glen Campbell) – 3:03
"T for Texas" (Jimmie Rodgers) – 3:31
"I Wonder If I Care as Much" (Don Everly, Phil Everly) – 2:59
"Ventura Boulevard" (Ron Elliott) – 2:50
"Shady Grove" (P. O. Wandz; credit also given to Jacquie Ertel (Phil's wife) and Venetia Everly (Don's wife)) – 2:31
Side 2
"Illinois" (Randy Newman) – 2:12
"Living Too Close to the Ground" (Terry Slater) – 2:16
"You Done Me Wrong" (George Jones, Ray Price) – 2:16
"Turn Around" (Ron Elliott) – 2:47
"Sing Me Back Home" (Merle Haggard) – 5:18
"Montage: The Everly Family (1952)/Shady Grove/Kentucky" (Terry Slater, Karl Davis) – 2:43

Personnel

Performance
Don Everly – guitar, vocals
Phil Everly – guitar, vocals

Production

Frank Bez – photography, cover photo
Perry Botkin, Jr. – arranger
Nick DeCaro – string arrangements
Ron Elliott – arranger
Lee Herschberg – engineer, mastering
Bill Inglot –reissue re- mastering
John Neil – engineer
Andrew Sandoval – re-issue re- mastering
Dave Schultz – mastering
Mike Shields – engineer
Ed Thrasher – art direction
Richie Unterberger – liner notes
Lenny Waronker – producer, concept
Andrew Wickham – liner notes, concept

References

External links
Collector's Choice Music reissue liner notes by Richie Unterberger.

The Everly Brothers albums
1968 albums
Albums arranged by Perry Botkin Jr.
Albums produced by Lenny Waronker
Warner Records albums